Andrea Hlaváčková and Max Mirnyi were the defending champions, but chose not to participate together.  Hlaváčková played alongside Alexander Peya, but lost in the second round to Taylor Townsend and Donald Young.  Mirnyi teamed up with Chan Hao-ching, but lost in the second round to Ashleigh Barty and John Peers.

Sania Mirza and Bruno Soares won the title, defeating Abigail Spears and Santiago González 6–1, 2–6, [11–9] in the final.

Seeds

Draw

Finals

Top half

Bottom half

References

External links
 Draw
2014 US Open – Doubles draws and results at the International Tennis Federation

Mixed Doubles
US Open - Mixed Doubles
US Open - Mixed Doubles
US Open (tennis) by year – Mixed doubles